Joaquín Olmos Forés (15 September 1915 – 22 February 2002) was a Spanish racing cyclist. He won 5 stages of the Vuelta a España throughout his career.

Major results

1936
 10th Overall Volta a Catalunya
1939
 8th Overall Volta a Catalunya
1942
 1st Stage 15 Vuelta a España
1944
 3rd National Cyclo-cross Championships
1945
 1st Stages 7 & 19 Vuelta a España
 2nd National Road Race Championships
 2nd GP Pascuas
 3rd Trofeo del Sprint
1946
 1st Stage 1 Vuelta a España
1947
 1st  Overall Vuelta a la Comunidad Valenciana
1st Stage 2
 3rd Trofeo Masferrer
 5th Overall Vuelta a España
1st Stage 22
1948
 3rd Trofeo del Sprint

References

External links
 

1915 births
2002 deaths
Spanish male cyclists
Spanish Vuelta a España stage winners
People from Baix Maestrat
Sportspeople from the Province of Castellón
Cyclists from the Valencian Community